Cristóbal Colón (born January 3, 1969) is a Venezuelan former professional baseball player. He played in Major League Baseball as a shortstop for the Texas Rangers (1992). He was a switch-hitting batter.

Colón was born in La Guaira, Vargas State, Venezuela. A nephew of former major league player Chico Carrasquel, Colón was named in honor of Christopher Columbus, by his father.

Colón was a career .167 hitter (6-for-36) with one RBI and five runs in 14 games.

See also
 List of players from Venezuela in Major League Baseball

External links

Pura Pelota

1969 births
Living people
Águilas del Zulia players
Auriga Caserta players
Butte Copper Kings players
Coastal Bend Aviators players
Fargo-Moorhead RedHawks players
Gastonia Rangers players
Gulf Coast Rangers players
Iowa Cubs players
Major League Baseball players from Venezuela
Major League Baseball shortstops
People from La Guaira
Petroleros de Poza Rica players
Potros de Minatitlán players
San Angelo Colts players
Sioux City Explorers players
Tiburones de La Guaira players
Texas Rangers players
Tulsa Drillers players
Venezuelan expatriate baseball players in Mexico
Venezuelan expatriate baseball players in the United States
Venezuelan expatriate baseball players in Italy
Venezuelan expatriate baseball players in Taiwan
Mercuries Tigers players